Franciszek Kareu (10 December 1731, Orsza – 11 August 1802, Polotsk) was a Polish-British Jesuit priest, missionary and teacher in the region of modern day Belarus. He was elected Temporary Vicar General of the Society of Jesus in Russia from 1799 to 1801.

Early years and formation
Born of a British family (Carew), settled in Grand Duchy of Lithuania, he followed the usual course of studies, humanities and philosophy, in Orsza before joining the Jesuits. Two years of novitiate in Vilnius (1754–56) were followed by a bout of teaching at Kražiai College (1756–58) and theology studies in Pinsk (1759–63) where he was ordained priest in 1762.

Career 
After missionary work in several places, Minsk, Nieswiez, and Slutsk, in 1768 Kareu arrived in Polotsk where he studied architecture under the guidance of the Jesuit architect, Gabriel Lenkiewicz, along with teaching philosophy and mathematics at the Jesuit College in Polotsk (1769–72). Being close to Stanislaus Czerniewicz and Lenkiewicz, he helped them in their efforts to keep the Society of Jesus going in Russia. He was made Rector of the High School of Orsza in 1782 and took part in the Regional Congregations of 1782 and 1785 which elected successively Cerniewicz and Lenkiewicz, Temporary Vicar General in Russia. After 1785, Kareu was made Rector of the most prestigious Jesuit College in Russia, Polotsk. In this period, he funded the purchase of a printing press from which, school manuals, philosophical and theological treatises and devotional books were produced.

Regional Congregation III 
On 12 February 1799, in the first ballot, Kareu was elected Vicar General of the Society in Russia. He soon had to deal with the bishop of Mogilev's desire to interfere in the appointment of Provincials and Rectors of the Society. Kareu appealed to Emperor Paul I, of Russia, who reaffirmed the independence of the Society, and asked for the Jesuits to take charge of a few projects in Lithuania and in Saint Petersburg, at the Church of Saint Catharina. The emperor's suggestion of a High school in St Petersburg was also accepted, but this could not be started as  Paul I was assassinated in March 1801.  His successor, Emperor Alexander I was far less friendly towards the Society and finally expelled it in 1820.

Superior General 
Through the establishment of the Jesuits in the Duchy of Parma in 1793, and the letter of endorsement from Emperor Paul I of Russia, the Pope, Pius VII began mechanisms that eventuated in the universal approval of the existence of the Society in 1814. In 1801 however, the strong opposition towards the existence of the Society from Charles IV of Spain led Pope Pius VII to qualify his acceptance of the Society by limiting it to the Russian Empire. He expressed this on 7 March 1801, in the Papal brief Catholicae fidei, through which Franciszek Kareu was made  'Superior General for Russia'.
After 1801, contact with ex-Jesuits increased, thanks to the efforts of his Assistant Gabriel Gruber, his future successor as 'Superior General for Russia'. In this period, the Rector of Stonyhurst (England) asked if the School might be allowed to affiliate itself with the Society in Russia. Negotiations also began for a union with the 'Paccanarist' priests. The Patriarch of Constantinople also asked for the Jesuits to serve in his area. During Kareu's vicariate of the Society in Russia, the universal restoration of the Society by the Catholic Church, became a distinct possibility.

Death
Ever since the beginning of 1801, Kareu had suffered from asthma. When he realised that his health had become a liability, he appointed an assistant, the Viennese, Gabriel Gruber who was himself later elected Vicar General. Kareu died in Polotsk on 11 August 1802.

References

Bibliography 
INGLOT, M., La Compagnia di Gesù nell'Impero Russo (1772–1820), Roma, 1997.
ZALENSKI, S., Les Jésuites de la Russie Blanche, (2 vol.), Paris, 1886.
ROUET de JOURNEL, M.J., La Compagnie de Jésus en Russie: un collège de Jésuites à Saint Pétersbourg (1800–16), Paris, 1922.

1731 births
1802 deaths
People from Orsha
18th-century Lithuanian Jesuits